Blaen Celyn is a hamlet in the  community of Llangrannog, Ceredigion, Wales,  east of Llangrannog village.

St. David's Church is now closed.

References

Villages in Ceredigion